Thomas Georg Wilhelm (born  in Stockholm) is a Swedish curler and curling coach.

Record as a coach of national teams

Private life
He is married to fellow wheelchair curler Anette Wilhelm, two-time Paralympic bronze medallist.

References

External links

Living people
1971 births
Sportspeople from Stockholm
Swedish male curlers
Swedish curling coaches